Camilo Escalona Medina is a Chilean politician. He was the President of the Senate.  He served as chairman of the Socialist Party of Chile from May 2006 until January 2010.

Publications
A transition from two sides. Chronic criticism and self LOM, Santiago, 1990, 
Chile, democracy, consensus, interviews, La Nación, Santiago, 2003
In check. Stories story, novel, Catalonia, Santiago, 2006, 
The attack, novel, Diagram, 2008, 
Chile, 20 years 1988 2008, diagram, 2008, 
Tales of Hell, Catalonia, Santiago, 2009, .
Unknown File Stories Margin Editorial, Santiago, 2011

References

External links
 

1955 births
Socialist Party of Chile politicians
Presidents of the Senate of Chile
Members of the Senate of Chile
Living people